ATP-binding cassette sub-family G member 5 is a protein that in humans is encoded by the ABCG5 gene.

Function 

The protein encoded by this gene is a member of the superfamily of ATP-binding cassette (ABC) transporters. ABC proteins transport various molecules across extra- and intra-cellular membranes. ABC genes are divided into seven distinct subfamilies (ABC1, MDR/TAP, MRP, ALD, OABP, GCN20, White). This protein is a member of the White subfamily. The protein encoded by this gene functions as a half-transporter to limit intestinal absorption and promote biliary excretion of sterols. It is expressed in a tissue-specific manner in the liver, colon, and intestine. This gene is tandemly arrayed on chromosome 2, in a head-to-head orientation with family member ABCG8. Mutations in this gene may contribute to sterol accumulation and atherosclerosis, and have been observed in patients with sitosterolemia.

Interactive pathway map

See also 
 ABCG5 and ABCG8 Genes

References

Further reading

External links 
 
 

ATP-binding cassette transporters